Post-processing may refer to:
 Image editing in photography
 Audio editing software in audio
 Differential GPS post-processing, an enhancement to GPS systems that improves accuracy
 Video post-processing, methods used in video processing and 3D graphics
 Finite element model data post-processing, software that makes computer calculation output easier to understand